In Buckley v. Valeo, decided in January 1976, the United States Supreme Court limited the reach of campaign finance laws to candidate and party committees, and other committees with a major purpose of electing candidates, or to speech that "expressly advocated" election or defeat of candidates. In footnote 52 of that opinion, the Court listed eight words or phrases as illustrative of speech that qualified as "express advocacy".

Importance of the eight magic words
Under the Buckley ruling, speakers that did not invoke any of the eight specific words and phrases of Buckley, or similar language expressly calling voters to vote for or against a candidate, were exempt from campaign finance laws.

The eight words and phrases appearing in Buckley were "vote for," "elect," "support", "cast your ballot for", "Smith for Congress", "vote against", "defeat", "reject", or any variations thereof.

That footnote was intended to provide examples of the types of things that would lead a reasonable person to conclude the speaker was advocating a particular candidate or ballot measure.

The Court felt that limiting campaign finance laws to speech with such express advocacy was necessary to avoid a "chilling effect" on speech about political officeholders and issues that was protected under the First Amendment to the Constitution.

Hypothetical example
Suppose someone placed an advertisement that went something like this:

John Smith is a decent man who earned his education in the field and stands up for worker rights. Mary Jones received her undergraduate degree at Yale, and a law degree at Northwestern.  She advocates eating vegetables. How do you feel about that?

Although the ad might influence potential voters for or against one of the candidates, it does not specifically advocate action to elect a candidate for office. As such, it falls outside of laws that restrict political speech intended to influence elections.

These type of ads became known colloquially as "issue ads".

See also
Buckley v. Valeo
Issue advocacy versus express advocacy

References

External links
 Issue Advocacy Advertising During the 1996 Campaign
 

Election campaigning
Political campaign techniques
Advertising regulation